Jacob Axel Gillberg (17 December 1769, Södermanland – 1 October 1845, Stockholm) was a Swedish miniature painter.

References

Gallery

Portrait miniaturists
Swedish painters
Swedish male painters
1769 births
1845 deaths